Fishing Creek may refer to a location in the United States:

Communities
 Fishing Creek, Maryland, an unincorporated community and census-designated place in Dorchester County
 Fishing Creek Township, Columbia County, Pennsylvania
 Fishing Creek Township, Granville County, North Carolina, in North Carolina
 Fishing Creek Township, Warren County, North Carolina, in North Carolina

Waterbodies

Delaware
 Fishing Creek (Blackbird Creek tributary), a tributary of Blackbird Creek in New Castle County

Maryland
 Fishing Creek (Maryland), a tributary of Little Choptank River along the Chesapeake Bay Eastern Shore
 Fishing Creek (Monocacy River), in the watershed of the Potomac River

Missouri
 Fishing Creek (Missouri), a tributary of the South Grand River

New Jersey
 Fishing Creek (Delaware Bay), a tributary of the Delaware River in New Jersey

North Carolina
 Fishing Creek (North Carolina), a tributary of the Tar River in North Carolina

Pennsylvania
 Fishing Creek (Bald Eagle Creek), in Clinton County, Pennsylvania
 Fishing Creek (North Branch Susquehanna River), in Columbia County, Pennsylvania
 East Branch Fishing Creek, a tributary in Columbia and Sullivan Counties
 Little Fishing Creek, a tributary in Columbia, Lycoming, and Sullivan Counties
 West Branch Fishing Creek, a tributary in Columbia and Sullivan Counties
 Fishing Creek (Susquehanna River) (east bank), in Dauphin County, Pennsylvania
 Fishing Creek (Perry County) (west bank Susquehanna River), in Pennsylvania
 Fishing Creek (York County), in Pennsylvania

South Carolina
 Fishing Creek (Catawba River), in the Santee River watershed in List of rivers of South Carolina where the Battle of Fishing Creek was fought in 1780

West Virginia
 Fishing Creek (West Virginia), a stream in West Virginia

See also
 Fishing Hawk Creek, a stream in West Virginia
 Fishing River, in Missouri
 Fish River (disambiguation)
 Fisher River (disambiguation)